Ken Nwosu is a British actor.

Education and career
Nwosu graduated from Drama Centre London in 2013.

Theatre
His work in theatre include the roles of Oswald in a 2016 Ghosts, BJJ in  An Octoroon in 2017 and Leo in White Noise in 2021. The newspaper i  said that "Nwosu gives a committed and graceful account of Leo's ever more demented determination." Shakespeare plays include Othello, The Merchant of Venice and As You Like It.

Film and TV
His film and TV roles include Paul Hastings in the comedy-drama Christopher Robin (2018), Max Sanford in the first season of Killing Eve (2018) and the lead in the three-part TV-drama Sticks and Stones (2019), Thomas Benson.

2020 and onwards roles include Ristridian in The Letter for the King (2020) and Eddie in Hollington Drive (2021). He is part of the cast in the, as of 2023, in production Arthurian TV-series The Winter King, where he plays Sagramor.

Awards
 He was nominated for the 2015 Ian Charleson Award for the role of Silvius in As You Like It.
 For An Octoroon, he won the Off West End Theatre Award, Full Run: Plays: Male Performance, 2017.

References

External links
 
 Ken Nwosu at Spotlight, a casting company
 Interview on This Morning, 2019
 An Octoroon | Creating the poster image, video with Nwosu at the National Theatre
 If we shadows have offended, video of Nwosu as Puck in Upstart Crow

Living people
British male stage actors
British male television actors
Black British male actors
British male film actors
British male Shakespearean actors
21st-century British male actors
Year of birth missing (living people)